The second fight between Tim Witherspoon and James “Bonecrusher” Smith took place on December 12, 1986, at Madison Square Garden in New York, New York, USA. The fight was contested for Witherspoon’s World Boxing Association heavyweight championship, and was Witherspoon’s second defense of the championship he had won from Tony Tubbs in January 1986.

Background
The fight was carried live on HBO World Championship Boxing, HBO’s then-flagship series of boxing telecasts. Barry Tompkins was the lead commentator with Larry Merchant and Sugar Ray Leonard as analysts. 

Don King Productions also produced its own broadcast of the fight, as it often did on cards that were promoted by King. The voice of King Productions, Bob Sheridan, called the fight. 

The official assigned to the bout was Luis Rivera, with judges Samuel Conde Lopez, Julio Roldan, and Joe Santarpia scoring. The bout was scheduled for fifteen rounds, as the WBA had yet to adopt the now-standard twelve round distance for title fights that had begun to be implemented following the death of fighter Duk Koo Kim in 1982. Under New York State rules, the three-knockdown rule was also in effect; this would come into play later.

Buildup

Heavyweight World Series
The fight was the sixth fight in the Heavyweight World Series, which was promoted by Don King and sought to crown an undisputed world champion. The heavyweight class had not seen an undisputed champion since 1978, after the World Boxing Council stripped Leon Spinks of their title; instead of facing Ken Norton in a mandatory defense of the title, Spinks opted instead to pursue a rematch with Muhammad Ali (which he eventually would lose). Since then, a third sanctioning body had been formed — the International Boxing Federation — and had gained worldwide recognition; the eventual winner of the multi-fight series would not only be the undisputed world champion but also be the first to hold three major world championships at the same time.

Witherspoon vs. Smith I
The first fight between Witherspoon and Smith took place on June 15, 1985 in Winchester, Nevada. Witherspoon was, at the time, the reigning North American Boxing Federation champion and defending his championship. In addition, the WBA sanctioned the fight as an elimination bout; the winner of the fight would receive a title match against reigning champion Tony Tubbs, who had defeated the former champion Greg Page earlier in 1985 to claim the title.

Witherspoon vs. Tubbs
The fight was a lopsided decision in favor of Witherspoon, who went on to defeat Tubbs in their championship fight. In doing so, he became the third man after Floyd Patterson and Ali to regain a championship after having previously been defeated for one; Witherspoon, who had previously been unsuccessful in wresting the WBC championship from Larry Holmes in 1983, defeated Page in 1984 to win the title after Holmes was stripped of it for choosing to fight Marvis Frazier instead of making a mandatory defense against Page. 

However, there were controversial circumstances surrounding the victory as Witherspoon failed a post-fight urine test. The usual procedure when this happens is to vacate the result of the fight and mark it officially as a no contest. Don King and the WBA, however, had discussions over allowing Witherspoon to retain the title. The two sides would eventually strike an agreement where the result of the fight was allowed to stand, but a rematch between the two fighters would be ordered by the WBA. July 1986 was the target date. 

However, Witherspoon and King began negotiating with Frank Bruno, the former European heavyweight champion and a rising contender, in his first defense of the title in London and convinced Tubbs to postpone the mandatory rematch. After he defeated Bruno by technical knockout in the eleventh round, the rematch with Tubbs was scheduled for December. 

Smith, meanwhile, was defeated by Marvis Frazier in his first fight after Witherspoon defeated him. He managed to rebound significantly in his next fight and knocked out former world champion  Mike Weaver in the first round. Smith then got a majority decision victory over Jesse Ferguson, a unanimous decision over David Bey, and had signed to face off against Mitch Green after that. 

However, shortly before the fight, chaos began to ensue. First, Tubbs pulled out citing a shoulder injury. King immediately cried foul, claiming that Tubbs was not actually injured but instead trying to get King to agree to increase his purse for the fight. Needing a replacement, the first choice was Tyrell Biggs, the former Olympic super heavyweight champion who had yet to be defeated and was already scheduled to fight Renaldo Snipes on the undercard. The sides could not agree on a purse for Biggs so King instead contacted Smith’s management and offered him the fight, which he accepted.

After that, a contentious news conference was scheduled to promote the fight two days before the telecast. Witherspoon threatened to pull out of the fight due to a dispute with King over his contractual terms. Green, who was left without an opponent once Smith took the title fight, also showed up at the news conference threatening to “break (King’s) neck” for what he believed was six years of purse money the promoter stole from him. HBO, meanwhile, threatened to not air any of the fights scheduled for that night if the main event did not go as scheduled.

Eventually, cooler heads prevailed and Witherspoon showed up for the prefight weigh-in the morning before the bout.

The fight
Smith’s trainer, former multiple division champion Emile Griffith, told him as he got ready to begin the fight “let’s go home early,” imploring him to take the fight to Witherspoon. As the bell rang, Smith did exactly this and within the first minute of the fight, the champion was hurt. Witherspoon tried to clinch to stop the onslaught but a determined Smith was able to fight out of each attempt and backed Witherspoon against the ropes. A hard overhand right to the head dropped the champion to a knee, which forced him to take a standing eight count. Smith resumed his assault after Witherspoon got up, hitting him with enough force to knock one of Witherspoon’s teeth out before knocking him down again. 

As mentioned above, this fight was contested with a three knockdown rule in effect. This rule dictates that if a fighter falls to the canvas three times in any round, the fight is automatically stopped and he loses by technical knockout. Witherspoon again rose to his feet and resumed fighting, needing to remain on his feet for the remainder of the round in order to continue. Smith resumed his assault, landing several heavy punches, and with forty-five seconds remaining in the round Witherspoon went down again. Roldan called a halt to the fight immediately after and Smith had pulled off a major upset. 

After the fight, the defeated former champion admitted that the pressure of the situations leading into it had gotten to him, saying that he was unable to get himself focused for the fight.

Aftermath
The winner of this fight was to face off against Mike Tyson, the reigning WBC champion, in the next fight in the unification series. That fight took place on March 7, 1987. Despite becoming the third fighter besides James Tillis  and the aforementioned Mitch Green to take Tyson to a decision, Smith lost a unanimous decision by a wide margin and had several points deducted for holding during the course of the fight. Smith never fought for a world championship again in his career, and he fought until 1999 when he lost a rematch against Larry Holmes, who defeated Smith for the International Boxing Federation championship by knockout in the twelfth round of a fifteen round fight in 1984. 

Witherspoon also never received a shot at any world championship following his defeat at the hands of Smith. He would receive championship opportunities for regional championships, including when he beat Carl “The Truth” Williams for the United States Boxing Association championship in 1991. Witherspoon fought until 2003, losing his final fight to Brian Nix by split decision.

References

World Boxing Association heavyweight championship matches
1986 in boxing
Boxing on HBO
Boxing matches at Madison Square Garden